Lo Que Me Gusta A Mí (English: "What I Like") is a song written and performed by Colombian singer-songwriter Juanes. The song is the fifth of six radio singles released in promotional of his studio album, Mi Sangre.

Track listing
"Lo Que Me Gusta A Mí" – 3:30 (Juan Esteban Aristizabal)

Charts

Weekly charts

Year-end charts

References

2006 singles
Juanes songs
Songs written by Juanes
Song recordings produced by Gustavo Santaolalla
Universal Music Latino singles
2004 songs